The 2010 Mitsubishi Electric Cup was a professional tennis tournament played on indoor red clay courts. It was part of the 2010 ATP Challenger Tour. It took place in Monza, Italy between 5 and 11 April 2010.

ATP entrants

Seeds

Rankings are as of March 22, 2010.

Other entrants
The following players received wildcards into the singles main draw:
  Andrea Arnaboldi
  Stefano Ianni
  Dejan Katić
  Matteo Trevisan

The following players received entry from the qualifying draw:
  Johannes Ager
  Francesco Aldi
  Benjamin Balleret
  Jesse Huta Galung

The following player received the lucky loser spot:
  Marcelo Demoliner

Champions

Singles

 Daniel Brands def.  Pablo Andújar, 6–7(4), 6–3, 6–4

Doubles

 Daniele Bracciali /  David Marrero def.  Martin Fischer /  Frederik Nielsen, 6–3, 6–3

References
 2010 Draws
 Official website
 ITF search 

Mitsubishi Electric Europe Cup
Mitsubishi Electric
Internazionali di Monza E Brianza